CC Cowboys is a Norwegian Rock band from Fredrikstad. Their members are the vocalist and guitarist Magnus Grønneberg, their guitarist Jørn Christensen their bassist Per Vestaby and their drummer Agne Sæther. The name of the band originates from the song "C.C. Cowboys" by Swedish rock group Imperiet.

Discography

Albums
Studio albums

Live albums

Compilation albums

Songs

References

External links
Norwegian Charts: CC Cowboys positions
 Store norske leksikon: CC Cowboys article

Spellemannprisen winners
Norwegian rock music groups